Count Alberto Maria "Tito" del Bono was an Italian tennis player. 

Del Bono was a two-time national champion in doubles. In 1929 he was the singles champion in Munich, which was the first edition of the modern day BMW Open. He played Davis Cup for Italy between 1929 and 1932 mainly as a doubles player, for four wins. In his only singles rubber he was beaten in four sets by Gottfried von Cramm in 1932.

A nobleman, deo Bono was a nephew of a famous Italian general and served as a lieutenant himself during the war.

See also
List of Italy Davis Cup team representatives

References

External links
 
 
 

Year of birth missing
Year of death missing
Italian male tennis players
Italian military personnel of World War II